Concorde Affaire '79, also known as The Concorde Affair, is a 1979 Italian action thriller directed by Ruggero Deodato and written by Ernesto Gastaldi and Renzo Genta. Released in the same year as The Concorde ... Airport '79 and featuring actor Joseph Cotten, who appeared in Airport '77, the film was an attempt by producers to take advantage of the success of the "Airport" film franchise of the 1970s.

Plot 
L.P.A. Flight 820, a Concorde test flight, is sabotaged which forces the plane to crash land in the ocean off coast of Martinique in the French Antillies of the Caribbean. The only survivor is a Jean Beneyton (Mimsy Farmer), a French hostess on the flight. Two fishermen find her, but then are soon killed off by a group of suited corporate agents who ride out in a speedboat, because they were witnesses to the crash.

In New York City, an American investigative reporter, Moses Brody (James Franciscus), receives a phone call from his ex-wife Nicole (Mag Fleming), who runs a local restaurant in Martinique, who tells him about an "important story". But upon arrival in Martinique, Brody learns that Nicole has died from an apparent "heart attack". Brody is devastated. Later that evening, while wandering the streets of the town, Brody is attacked by a gang of thugs, but is rescued by a mysterious local man named George, who owns a fishing trawler and tells him that Nicole was a friend of his and she was killed because she knew that the crashed Concorde flight landed on a reef nearby and the two of them decide to investigate.

Meanwhile, a shady businessman named Milland (Joseph Cotten) and his business partner Danker (Edmund Purdom) learn about the Concorde crash and after consulting with their associate, Martinez, plot to cover up any evidence involved with the crash. It becomes apparent that Milland and Danker are behind the events.

Brody and George are in a boat when they see Jean Beneyton jump off of the henchmen's boat and attempts to swim away before she is recaptured. Later, they arrive at the crash site and after donning scuba gear they find the wreck of the Concorde submerged under 100 feet of water in the Caribbean. While Brody goes inside the wreck, George gets his arm stuck in a jagged part of machinery and Brody has to amputate George's left arm to free him. Moses discovers explosive charges on the downed plane which were planted earlier by Milland's henchmen to destroy any evidence of foul play.

Upon surfacing, George gets hit in the goggles by a bullet as several henchmen in a speedboat appear and attack. Brody is forced to go back down under the water with two scuba men in chase. Brody outwits them by hiding in an underwater cave in which he goes back to the surface and pulls out the henchman who remained behind in the speedboard and steals it.

Brody then goes to the United States Consul of Martinique, and wants to start an investigation. He then takes them to the site and finds nothing. They call off the search for the missing Concorde. Brody then says that he saw Jean on a yacht. The Consul then says that if he knew it was Brody, he would have gotten him off the case as Brody was reporting a scandal concerning a Congressman.

Meanwhile, Milland and his men watch a video as the submerged Concorde explodes. They then find out that Jean is alive and being held for a $1 million ransom. At the same time, another L.P.A. Concorde plane lands in Rio de Janeiro, Brazil which prepares itself for a flight from Venezuela to London.

That evening, Brody sneaks on board the henchmen's boat, where he overhears them saying that they want to get rid of Jean and also overhears them talking about their superiors taking down a second Concorde flight. Brody rescues her and they escape from the boat. After reaching the shore, Brody tries talking to Jean about the crash, but she is so shaken by the traumatic experience that she can't remember very much. In the morning, they hitch a ride on a banana truck driven by a local farmer. But soon Milland's henchmen, led by Forsythe (Venantino Venantini) find Brody and Jean again and give chase, but they are cut off by a construction vehicle.

On board the airborne second Concorde, L.P.A. Flight 128, a crew member turns on one of the inboard engines on the plane. Up in the cockpit, the pilot Captain Scott (Van Johnson) discovers something which same thing happened as with the first attack: loss of power. This is because a henchman puts vials of acid in the food of the flight which breaks upon being heated up and acid breaks through the microwave ovens and severs the electrical lines in the cabin.

In Martinique, Brody calls the Consul and has Jean begin to tell her story about it, but they are cut off as the henchmen are back. As the Consul calls up his associates in London with his ideas to what might be happening, the chase continues. The Concorde then loses radio contact with London control, and the cabin lights begin to flicker. Captain Scott soon regains contact with London, who suggests they run a circuit control. The London air traffic controller (Robert Kerman) also gets a call from Jean. The controller then reports they can't reach the Concorde. On board the plane, the navigator (Roberto Santi) then reports that pressure in the main cabin is dropping.

On the ground, Jean contacts the American Consul at a bank, but Forsythe and his henchmen arrive again, and she and Brody have to run. This time, the police are there and enter a shootout with the men in which all of the henchmen are killed.

Meanwhile, London Air Traffic Control gets radio contact with the Concorde on a VHF frequence. Captain Scott on the Concorde then descends the aircraft to a lower altitude below 12,000 feet, but London now can't get Concorde on the VHF frequency, either. Brody and Jean reach the American Consul and she begins describing what happened.

The Concorde banks and the number one engine overheats. London control reports that the crash began with overheating of the oven. The crew discovers the number one engine is now on fire, and they quickly extinguish it. The Concorde continues its descent, as one passenger becomes hysterical.

The plane then levels out at 9,000 feet. London control can now see them on radar, and proceed to clear a runway. Concorde then makes a beautiful landing. Brody is relieved.

The next day, Milland contacts Brody by phone where he wants to offer him a shady contract after reading the headline "Concorde Passengers Saved by Journalist". Jean thinks that he'll get a big welcome in New York. Brody jokingly states that he doesn't have to go, and they laugh. He says he has to pay a visit "to a certain bigshot". Jean then gets on an Air France flight to return to Paris, but before she leaves he says he'll give her a call.

Brody then calls his friend Alfie and says that he wants to "push a certain Humpty Dumpty off his wall". He says he wants to know the heads of the top corporations in New York City, heavily involved in aircraft sales to South American countries, specifically those most hurt by competition from Concorde. The credits begin over footage of a Concorde in flight.

Cast 
James Franciscus as Moses Brody
Mimsy Farmer as Jean Beneyton
Van Johnson as Captain Scott
Joseph Cotten as Milland
Venantino Venantini as Forsythe
Fiamma Maglione as Nicole Brody (credited as "Mag Fleming")
Edmund Purdom as Danker
Francisco Charles as George
Francesco Carnelutti as co-pilot on the second plane
Ottaviano Dell'Acqua as John
Aldo Barberito as Priest
Renzo Marignano as Martinez
John Stacy as American Consul
Robert Kerman as air traffic controller

External links 
 
 
 

1979 films
1970s action thriller films
Concorde
Italian aviation films
1970s crime drama films
1970s crime thriller films
Italian disaster films
1970s disaster films
Films directed by Ruggero Deodato
1970s Italian-language films
English-language Italian films
1970s English-language films
Italian drama films
Films about aviation accidents or incidents
Films shot in New York City
Films shot in London
Films shot in Martinique
Films shot in New Jersey
Films shot in Paris
Films with screenplays by Ernesto Gastaldi
Films scored by Stelvio Cipriani
Films produced by Luciano Martino
1979 drama films
1979 multilingual films
Italian multilingual films
1970s Italian films